Syngamilyta is a genus of moths of the family Crambidae described by Embrik Strand in 1920.

Species
Syngamilyta apicolor (Druce, 1902)
Syngamilyta nympha Munroe, 1960
Syngamilyta pehlkei (E. Hering, 1906)
Syngamilyta pretiosalis (Schaus, 1912)
Syngamilyta samarialis (Druce, 1899)

References

Spilomelinae
Crambidae genera
Taxa named by Embrik Strand